MEU may refer to:

 Marine Expeditionary Unit, a military task force
 Model European Union, a politics education exercise
 A Dictionary of Modern English Usage, the style guide by H.W. Fowler (or any of its posthumous editions)
 meu,  ISO 639-3 code for the Motu language
Middle East University, a Christian university in Lebanon

See also
 Meu